The Kohinoor was a Bengali language newspaper, first published in July 1898. Initially focusing on miscellaneous topics such as Islamic culture, its third relaunch was a pivot of Hindu-Muslim harmony. The paper targeted both Hindu and Muslim clientele.

History
The Kohinoor started publication in July 1898 in Kushtia District after Rowshan Ali Chowdhury met Mir Mosharraf Hossain. During its initial years, publication was irregular and lasted for about a year. It resumed publication in April 1904 and promoted harmony between Muslims and Hindus; the two largest religious groups in Bengal. On that same year, it also criticised the Urdu-speaking elite who looked down upon the Bengali language due to a superiority complex. This second phase lasted up until around 1907. It made another comeback in April 1911 continuing on for another year.

Location
The newspaper moved its headquarters from Kushtia to Pangsha (then part of Faridpur District). It was edited by Mohammad Rowshan Ali Chowdhury, a resident of Pangsha. It later relocated to Calcutta.

Members
Rowshan Ali Chowdhury was the founder and chief editor of The Kohinoor. It was managed by a 35-member committee containing both Muslims and Hindus. Ismail Hossain Siraji, Maniruzzaman Islamabadi and Abdullah Al-Mamun Suhrawardy regularly contributed to the magazine. In early 1914, Yakub Ali Chowdhury wrote an article relating to the language and literature of Bengali Muslims.

References

Bengali-language newspapers published in India
Defunct newspapers published in India
Publications established in 1898
Publications disestablished in 1912